Homs Military Academy is a military educational and training institution located in Homs, Syria.

Homs Military Academy was founded in 1933 by France during the Mandate for Syria and the Lebanon. 
During the period of French administration the academy provided officer training for the Troupes Speciales du Levant - the locally recruited Syrian and Lebanese units forming part of the Army of the Levant.

Continuing in existence after the end of the Mandate in 1943 and throughout various political changes, it remains the oldest and largest military service institution in Syria. At first, it was primarily an academy for infantry officers, while graduates who selected the other services went on to additional specialized training at other army-operated specialist schools. Graduates were often selected for a military academy in the Soviet Union.

Homs Academy allowed entrants who did not possess high level education qualifications, as well as offering a relatively rare rapid career path for graduates. In addition to large numbers of Syrian and Lebanese nationals it also offered officer training to French citizens who were denied by class or education from attending comparable academies within France.

Notable alumni
 Ziad al-Atassi - Major General
 Lu'ay al-Atassi - Lieutenant-General, military attache to USA. Titular President during interim government.
 Ali Abdullah Ayyoub -  Deputy Prime Minister of Syria, senior Syrian Arab Army officer and former Minister of Defense
 Adnan al-Malki - Deputy-Chief of Staff of Syrian Army
 Ali Aslan Lieutenant General, Assistant Chief of Staff of Syrian Army
 Bashar al-Assad Syrian President
 Hafez al-Assad Former Syrian President
 Rifat al-Assad brother of Former Syrian President 
 Adnan Badr Hassan Former intelligence chief
 Suheil Al Hassan Brigadier General, Commander of Elite Tiger Forces
 Ali Haydar "Father of the Syrian Special Forces, served as commander of the Syrian Special Forces for 26 years
 Salah Jadid Major General, De Facto former leader of Syria
 Ghazi Kanaan
 Hassan Khalil - Former Head of Military Intelligence of Syria
 Hikmat al-Shihabi - Former chief of staff of the Syrian Army
 Bahjat Suleiman Major General, Former Syrian Ambassador to Jordan and Head of Internal Branch of General Intelligence Directorate.
 Fawzi Selu - both a graduate and later director of the academy
 Manaf Tlass former Brigadier General of the Syrian Republican Guard and member of Bashar al-Assad's inner circle
 Mustafa Tlass former Syrian senior military officer and politician who was Syria's minister of defense from 1972 to 2004.

References

 
Educational institutions established in 1933
Buildings and structures in Homs
1933 establishments in Mandatory Syria
Universities in Syria